Sergey Aleksandrovich Belousov (born 4 May 1990) is a Russian association football midfielder. He plays for FC Yelets.

Career
Belousov made his professional debut for Saturn on 15 July 2009 in the Russian Cup game against FC Luch-Energiya Vladivostok. In the 2009 summer transfer window, he moved to Russian Second Division's Zhemchuzhina-Sochi on loan until the end of the season.

A product of FC Yelets's youth football system, Belousov has played in the Russian Premier League with FC Saturn and FC Rostov.

References

External links
 
 Profile at stats.sportbox.ru 

1990 births
People from Yelets
Living people
Russian footballers
Russia youth international footballers
Russia national football B team footballers
FC Saturn Ramenskoye players
FC Zhemchuzhina Sochi players
FC Torpedo Moscow players
FC Rostov players
Russian Premier League players
FC Shinnik Yaroslavl players
FC Sokol Saratov players
Association football midfielders
FC Metallurg Lipetsk players
Sportspeople from Lipetsk Oblast